Nawab Jan is an Indian politician and a member of the 16th Legislative Assembly of Uttar Pradesh and 17th Legislative Assembly of Uttar Pradesh, India. He represents the Thakurdwara constituency of Uttar Pradesh and is a member of the Samajwadi Party political party.

Early life and education
Nawab Jan was born in Moradabad district, Uttar Pradesh. Before being elected as MLA, he used to work as an agriculturist.

Political career
Nawab Jan has been a MLA for 2nd term and represents the Thakurdwara constituency. He is a member of the Samajwadi Party political party. Jan was elected during the by-elections in Sep 2014 and  assembly election in 2017.

Posts Held

See also
Samajwadi Party
Sixteenth Legislative Assembly of Uttar Pradesh
Thakurdwara
Uttar Pradesh Legislative Assembly

References 

1958 births
Living people
People from Moradabad district
Samajwadi Party politicians
Uttar Pradesh MLAs 2012–2017
Uttar Pradesh MLAs 2017–2022
Uttar Pradesh MLAs 2022–2027